The state anthem of the Republic of Karelia was approved by law on 6 April 1993. The music of the anthem was composed by Alexander Beloborodov and in most parts follows the melody of the Finnish traditional song "Karjalan kunnailla". The Russian lyrics were written by Armas Mishin and Ivan Kostin, whilst the Finnish lyrics were written by Mishin alone, and the Karelian lyrics by Alexander Volkov. Since December 2001, the Russian lyrics are the official ones.

Lyrics

See also

Anthem of the Karelo-Finnish Soviet Socialist Republic

References

External links
An introduction from government page.
Russian vocal version from government page and Andrew Heninen's site.
Russian lyrics.
Finnish lyrics.
translated English lyrics.

Culture of the Republic of Karelia
Regional songs
Karelia
Karelia
National anthem compositions in E major